The Winona Rail Bridge was a swing bridge that spanned the Mississippi River between Winona, Minnesota, and Winona Junction in Buffalo, Buffalo County, Wisconsin. It was built to link the Winona and St. Peter Railroad with the La Crosse, Trempealeau & Prescott Railroad. Both became part of the Chicago and North Western Transportation Company (C&NW). The swing span was removed, but the box girder portion of the bridge still extends from Latsch Island just downstream of the current Main Channel Bridge. Piers from the original 1871 bridge and the box girders are in the North Channel just downstream of the current North Channel Bridge.

History

Temporary bridge
On December 29, 1870, the Mississippi River was bridged by the first Winona Rail Bridge, a temporary bridge built in 4 days that connected with the La Crosse, Trempealeau & Prescott Railroad. The La Crosse, Trempealeau & Prescott, another enterprise of the C&NW, chartered to build from a point across the river from Winona to connect with the Chicago, Milwaukee and St. Paul Railroad at Winona Junction in Wisconsin near La Crosse. This connection allowed through railroad traffic from Chicago into Southern Minnesota, without having to ferry cars. It was the first train to cross the Mississippi above Dubuque, Iowa.

Swing bridge first day of operation incident
The permanent swing bridge was completed in May 1871. It partially collapsed when the bridge tender failed to secure the swing span on the first day of operation on May 26, 1871. The bridge was rebuilt and was reopened for traffic on January 16, 1872.

Milwaukee Road
The Chicago, Milwaukee and St. Paul Railroad would use this bridge to reach its track in Minnesota until the construction of the La Crosse Rail Bridge by 1876.

Replacements
The swing span was replaced in 1899. The entire bridge was reconstructed by C&NW in 1928, replacing the through-truss approach spans with plate girder spans.

Retirement
The bridge was no longer used by 1977 and the swing span was removed in 1980. The Winona Subdivision of the Union Pacific is reached by trackage rights over the La Crosse Rail Bridge.

See also
List of bridges documented by the Historic American Engineering Record in Minnesota
List of bridges documented by the Historic American Engineering Record in Wisconsin
List of crossings of the Upper Mississippi River
Winona Green Bay and Western Rail Bridge (historical)

References

External links

Buildings and structures in Winona County, Minnesota
Swing bridges in the United States
Railroad bridges in Minnesota
Bridges over the Mississippi River
Bridges completed in 1871
Chicago and North Western Railway
Demolished bridges in the United States
Historic American Engineering Record in Minnesota
Steel bridges in the United States
Interstate railroad bridges in the United States
Railroad bridges in Wisconsin
Historic American Engineering Record in Wisconsin